The tornado outbreak of May 1927 occurred between May 7–9 in the Midwestern and Southern United States, producing numerous strong tornadoes and killing at least 217 people.

Confirmed tornadoes

See also
List of North American tornadoes and tornado outbreaks

Notes

References

Bibliography

Tornadoes of 1927
J
1927 natural disasters in the United States
Tornadoes in Arkansas
Tornadoes in Illinois
Tornadoes in Iowa
Tornadoes in Michigan
Tornadoes in Texas
Tornadoes in Kansas
May 1927 events